Tatarskaya Bashmakovka is a rural locality (a selo) and the administrative center of Tatarobashmakovsky Selsoviet, Privolzhsky District, Astrakhan Oblast, Russia. The population was 2,497 as of 2010. There are 64 streets.

Geography 
Tatarskaya Bashmakovka is located 31 km southwest of Nachalovo (the district's administrative centre) by road. Steklozavoda is the nearest rural locality.

References 

Rural localities in Privolzhsky District, Astrakhan Oblast